"Shit on the Radio (Remember the Days)", censored as "...on the Radio (Remember the Days)", is the third official single from Canadian singer-songwriter Nelly Furtado's debut album, Whoa, Nelly!. The song's album title "Shit on the Radio (Remember the Days)" was censored and the word "shit" was removed from the title for radio airplay and substituted on the cover art with "#*@!!".

Despite the success of Furtado's previous two singles, the song failed to chart on the US Billboard Hot 100 and began a string of singles for Furtado that failed to chart until "Promiscuous" in 2006. "...on the Radio (Remember the Days)" charted in other countries, entering the top 10 in the Netherlands (No. 7), Portugal (No. 6), and New Zealand (No. 5).

Background and writing
Furtado, who wrote the song in one session, said it is about the feelings of insecurity she experienced when hiding her desire to make pop music to fit in with her underground musical peers. "I could try to be cool and whatever, but why do I have to try?", she said. "Why can't I just be myself? The moment you make that step and say, 'I want to make pop music' is a big thing. But no matter what happens to me there'll always be someone going, 'Oh, her music sucks now because everyone likes it.' I feel that song a lot."

Music video
The music video for "...on the Radio (Remember the Days)" was directed by Hype Williams and features fellow British Columbian recording artists Swollen Members. The video begins with a remix of the intro of the song, with Furtado writing in chalk the director's name and editor's name. Soon after Furtado begins listening to music with earmuffs and the camera is showing parts of the room Furtado is in. The lyrics begin to play and Furtado is singing on the bed with earmuffs. She gets up and picks up a radio and walks out of the house. Then, Furtado gets in a car while dancers start doing tricks in an alleyway. The second verse shows Furtado singing to the camera while driving a car and she ends up where the dancers are and starts to sing the chorus with them while dancing. The bridge shows Furtado lying in the grass holding a flower and singing upwards to the camera, and then shows her running up to the stage where there is a concert going on where she begins to sing the last part of the song. The concert crowd begins to shout "myself" while the music stops then begins again. The video ends with Furtado in quick 15 second flashes on a TV screen singing and dancing with the dancers at the concert. The underground version places Furtado in a wooded shed similar to the one in the "Turn Off the Light" underground video, and also leaning on a stone singing the song outdoors in a clearing.

Track listings

UK CD single
 "...on the Radio (Remember the Days)" – 3:54
 "...on the Radio (Remember the Days)"  – 5:26
 "I'm Like a Bird"  – 4:54

UK cassette single
 "...on the Radio (Remember the Days)" 
 "I'm Like a Bird" 

European CD single
 "...on the Radio (Remember the Days)" 
 "...on the Radio (Remember the Days)" 

European maxi-CD single
 "...on the Radio (Remember the Days)" 
 "...on the Radio (Remember the Days)" 
 "Turn Off the Light" 
 "...on the Radio (Remember the Days)" 

Australian CD single
 "...on the Radio (Remember the Days)"  – 3:54
 "...on the Radio (Remember the Days)" – 3:54
 "Turn Off the Light"  – 4:40
 "Turn Off the Light"  – 7:00
 "...on the Radio (Remember the Days)"  – 4:00

Credits and personnel
Credits are adapted from the Whoa, Nelly! album booklet.

Studios
 Recorded and engineered at The Gymnasium (Toronto, Canada) and Can-Am Recorders (Tarzana, Los Angeles)
 Mixed at Can-Am Recorders (Tarzana, Los Angeles)
 Mastered at Classic Sound (New York City)

Personnel

 Nelly Furtado – writing, lead vocals, background vocals, acoustic guitars, programming, production
 Brian West – acoustic guitars, production, programming, recording, engineering
 Lil' Jaz – scratches
 Gerald Eaton – programming, production
 Brad Haehnel – mixing, recording, engineering
 John Knupp – second engineering
 Scott Hull – mastering

Charts

Weekly charts

Year-end charts

Release history

References

2000 songs
2002 singles
DreamWorks Records singles
Music videos directed by Hype Williams
Nelly Furtado songs
Songs about consumerism
Songs about radio
Songs written by Nelly Furtado